The Justinus Stoll House is an 18th-century house at 7 Stoll's Alley, Charleston, South Carolina. The earliest record of a house appeared in  when Justinus Stoll, a blacksmith, bought the property. The house was the second historic house on Stoll's Alley to be restored by Mrs. George Canfield.

References

Houses in Charleston, South Carolina
Houses completed in the 18th century